Arkādijs Pavlovs (2 February 1903, in Riga – 26 June 1960, in Riga) was a Latvian footballer and football manager, a five-time champion of Latvia.

Biography
Pavlovs began playing football while in refuge during World War I in Yekaterinoslav. After returning to Latvia he played with Marss Riga and Amatieris for a short period but in 1924 Pavlovs joined the most important club of his career - RFK. Playing with RFK Pavlovs won five Latvian Higher League titles and became a two-time winner of the Riga Football Cup. From 1924 to 1933 he played for the Latvia national football team in total making 37 appearances and scoring 9 goals . Palvovs was a member of the Latvian football team at the 1924 Summer Olympics. Pavlovs scored the first goal in the history of the Baltic Cup and won the first tournament with Latvia in 1928.

After the 1934 football season Pavlovs joined the lower league club Kružoks Riga with which he played until 1939. In 1938 Pavlovs was a member of the Kružoks squad that earned promotion to the Latvian Higher League. In Kružoks Palvovs was the most experienced footballer and the informal leader of the club both on the field and off it.

Honours
Club Titles

Latvian Higher League: 1924, 1925, 1926, 1930, 1931 (RFK)
Riga Football Cup: 1924, 1925 (RFK)

National Team
Baltic Cup: 1928

References

External links
 
 

1903 births
1960 deaths
Footballers from Riga
People from Kreis Riga
Latvian footballers
Latvia international footballers
Latvian football managers
Olympic footballers of Latvia
Footballers at the 1924 Summer Olympics
Association football forwards